The 2014 World Women's Curling Championship (branded as Ford World Women's Curling Championship 2014 for sponsorship reasons) was held from 15 to 23 March at the Harbour Station in Saint John, New Brunswick.

Qualification
The following nations are qualified to participate in the 2014 World Women's Curling Championship:
 (host country)
One team from the Americas zone
 (given that no challenges in the Americas zone are issued)
Eight teams from the 2013 European Curling Championships

Two teams from the 2013 Pacific-Asia Curling Championships

Teams
{| class=wikitable
|-
!width=200|
!width=200|
!width=200|
|-
| Ottawa CC, Ottawa
Skip: Rachel Homan 
Third: Emma Miskew 
Second: Alison Kreviazuk 
Lead: Lisa Weagle 
Alternate: Stephanie LeDrew
| Harbin CC, Harbin
Skip: Liu Sijia 
Third: Jiang Yilun 
Second: Wang Rui 
Lead: Liu Jinli 
Alternate: She Qiutong
|CC Sokol Liboc, Prague
Skip: Anna Kubešková 
Third: Tereza Plíšková 
Second: Klára Svatoňová 
Lead: Veronika Herdová 
Alternate: Alžběta Baudyšová
|-
!width=200|
!width=200|
!width=200|
|-
|Hvidovre CC, Hvidovre 
Skip: Madeleine Dupont
Third: Denise Dupont
Second: Christine Svensen
Lead: Lina Almindingen Knudsen 
Alternate: Isabella Clemmensen
|SC Riessersee, Garmisch-Partenkirchen
Skip: Imogen Oona Lehmann
Third: Corinna Scholz
Second: Nicole Muskatewitz
Lead: Stella Heiß
Alternate: Claudia Beer
|SC OndulatB, Riga
Skip: Evita Regža
Third: Dace Regža
Second: Ieva Bērziņa
Lead: Žaklīna Litauniece
Alternate: Iluta Linde
|-
!width=200|
!width=200|
!width=200|
|-
||Moskvitch CC, Moscow
Skip: Anna Sidorova
Third: Margarita Fomina
Second: Aleksandra Saitova
Lead: Ekaterina Galkina
Alternate: Nkeiruka Ezekh
|Currie and Balerno CC, Edinburgh 
Skip: Kerry Barr 
Third: Rachael Simms 
Second: Rhiann Macleod 
Lead: Barbara McPake 
Alternate: Hannah Fleming|Gyeonggi-do CC, GyeonggiFourth: Gim Un-chi 
Skip: Kim Ji-sun 
Second: Lee Seul-bee 
Lead: Um Min-ji 
Alternate: Shin Mi-sung|-
!width=200|
!width=200|
!width=200|
|-
||Skellefteå CK, SkellefteåFourth: Maria Prytz
Third: Christina Bertrup
Second: Maria Wennerström
Skip: Margaretha Sigfridsson
Alternate: Sara McManus||Flims CC, FlimsSkip: Binia Feltscher 
Third: Irene Schori 
Second: Franziska Kaufmann 
Lead: Christine Urech 
Alternate: Carole Howald|St. Paul CC, St. PaulSkip: Allison Pottinger 
Third: Nicole Joraanstad 
Second: Natalie Nicholson 
Lead: Tabitha Peterson 
Alternate: Tara Peterson|}

Round-robin standingsFinal round-robin standingsRound-robin results
All draw times are listed in Atlantic Standard Time (UTC−4).

Draw 1Saturday, 15 March, 14:30Draw 2Saturday, 15 March, 19:30Draw 3Sunday, 16 March, 9:30Draw 4Sunday, 16 March, 14:30Draw 5Sunday, 16 March, 19:30Draw 6Monday, 17 March, 9:30Draw 7Monday, 17 March, 14:30Draw 8Monday, 17 March, 19:30Draw 9Tuesday, 18 March, 9:30Draw 10Tuesday, 18 March, 14:30Draw 11Tuesday, 18 March, 19:30Draw 12Wednesday, 19 March, 9:30Draw 13Wednesday, 19 March, 14:30Draw 14Wednesday, 19 March, 19:30Draw 15Thursday, 20 March, 9:30Draw 16Thursday, 20 March, 14:30Draw 17Thursday, 20 March, 19:30TiebreakerFriday, 21 March, 14:30Playoffs

1 vs. 2Friday, 21 March, 19:303 vs. 4Saturday, 22 March, 9:00SemifinalSaturday, 22 March, 14:00Bronze medal gameSunday, 23 March, 12:00FinalSunday, 23 March, 19:30Statistics
Top 5 player percentagesRound robin only''

References
General

Specific

External links

World Women's Curling Championship
World Women's Curling Championship
Curling competitions in Saint John, New Brunswick
World Women's Curling Championship
World Women's Curling Championship
World Curling Championship
Women's curling competitions in Canada
International sports competitions hosted by Canada
World Curling Championship